Trinathotrema is a genus of lichen-forming fungi in the family Stictidaceae. It has three species. The genus was circumscribed in 2011 by Robert Lücking, Eimy Rivas Plata, and Armin Mangold, with Trinathotrema stictideum assigned as the type species. The genus name is an imperfect anagram in honour of American lichenologist Thomas Nash III, combining the letters -tho, -na, and -tri. Although most members of the Stictidaceae have  green algae as their  partner, Trinathotrema associates with a  photobiont.

Species

 Trinathotrema hierrense 
 Trinathotrema lumbricoides 
 Trinathotrema stictideum

References

Ostropales
Taxa described in 2011
Lichen genera
Ostropales genera
Taxa named by Robert Lücking